The Syria women's national 3x3 team is a national basketball team of Syria, administered by the Syrian Basketball Federation.
It represents the country in international 3x3 (3 against 3) women's basketball competitions.

Competition record

Summer Olympics

3x3 World Cup

3x3 Asia Cup

Asian Games

Asian Indoor Games

Asian Beach Games

Islamic Solidarity Games

Team

Current roster
The following is the Syria roster in the women's 3x3 basketball tournament of the 2018 Asian Games.
Farah Assad
Noura Bshara
Johna Mbayed
Cedra Suleiman

See also
Syria women's national basketball team

References

Syria women's national basketball team
Women's national 3x3 basketball teams